Jamie Peter McIlroy (born 19 June 1994) is an English professional cricketer who plays for Glamorgan. McIlroy is a right-handed batsman and left-arm fast-medium bowler.

From Builth Wells, McIlroy was playing for Herefordshire in the Minor Counties Cricket Championship before signing a professional contract with Glamorgan in 2019. He signed an extension in September 2020 after injury ruled him out of the entire 2020 summer season that was truncated severely by the COVID-19 pandemic.

He made his first-class debut on 8 April 2021, the opening day of the 2021 County Championship as Glamorgan faced Yorkshire at Headingley. He made his Twenty20 debut on 2 July 2022, for Glamorgan in the 2022 T20 Blast.

References

External links

1994 births
Living people
English cricketers
Glamorgan cricketers
Sportspeople from Hereford